Folklore of Assam is a comprehensive book on Assamese folklore authored by Jogesh Das. The book was published by National Book Trust in 1972. The book is a part of the Folklore of India series. The book is originally written in English and then in other Indian languages.

References

External links
Folklore of Assam in Openlibrary

1972 books
Indian folklore
Assamese literature
Indian non-fiction books
20th-century Indian books